Hoffman is a German or Jewish surname or given name.

Hoffman, Hofmann or Hoffmann may also refer to:

Places
In the United States:
Hoffman, Illinois (village)
Hoffman Estates, Illinois (village)
Hoffman, Minnesota (city)
Hoffman, Missouri, an unincorporated community
Hoffman, New Jersey (unincorporated community)
Hoffmans, New Jersey (unincorporated community)
Hoffman, North Carolina (town)
Hoffman, Oklahoma (town)
Hoffman Island, near Staten Island, New York
Hoffman, settlement in the Virgin Islands

Animals
Hoffmann's two-toed sloth, a species of sloth from Central and South America
Hoffmann's woodpecker, a resident breeding bird from southern Honduras south to Costa Rica
Hoffmanns's woodcreeper, a species of bird in the Dendrocolaptinae subfamily
Hoffmann's pika, a species of mammal in the family Ochotonidae
Hoffmann's rat, a species of rodent in the family Muridae

Artistic works
Hoffman (film), 1970 comedy film by Alvin Rakoff starring Peter Sellers
The Tales of Hoffmann, 1881 opera by Jacques Offenbach
The Tales of Hoffmann (film), 1951 film
"Lost Keys" (Blame Hofmann), song by Tool
 The Tragedy of Hoffmann, or a Revenge for a Father (played 1602; printed 1631) by Henry Chettle

Other
Arthur and Mona Hofmann House, historical home designed by Richard Neutra in Hillsborough, California.
Hoffman Television, a manufacturer of television sets in the 1950s and 1960s
Hoffman (Cleveland automobile)
Hoffman (Detroit automobile)
Hoffmann (German automobile)
Hoffmann (motorcycle), a former German bicycle and motorcycle manufacturer
Hoffmann–La Roche, a Swiss pharmaceutical company
Hoffmann's anodyne, a drug used as a painkiller or hypnotic
Hoffmann's sign, a reflex in the hand
Hofmann elimination, a process where an amine is reacted to create a tertiary amine and an alkene
Hofmann GmbH, a German producer of road marking technology
Hofmann rearrangement, the organic reaction of a primary amide to a primary amine with one fewer carbon atom
Hofmann (restaurant), a Michelin starred restaurant in Barcelona, Spain
The Hoffman Agency, a global high-tech public relations firm
Hofmann voltameter, a piece of chemistry apparatus sometimes used to collect hydrogen and oxygen gas created in the electrolysis of water

See also
Huffman (disambiguation)